Henry Eastham may refer to:

 Harry Eastham (1917–1998), English footballer
 Henry W. Eastham, Massachusetts politician